Manchu Manoj Kumar (born 20 May 1983) is an Indian actor who works in Telugu films. He first appeared at the age of ten as a child artist in Major Chandrakanth. He made his film debut in a leading role with Donga Dongadi in 2004. He received the state Nandi Special Jury Award for his performance in box-office success Bindaas (2010). He also starred in  Vedam (2010), Potugadu (2013), and Pandavulu Pandavulu Thummeda (2014).

Early life
Manchu Manoj was born on 20 May 1983, to film actor Mohan Babu and Nirmala Devi. He has an elder sister Lakshmi and an elder brother Vishnu, who are both actors.

Career

Child actor
Manoj was familiar to the Telugu audience right from his childhood. He played many roles as a child actor in his own banner movies where his father Mohan Babu is shown as a child in flashbacks. He was well received for the role he played in the film Major Chandrakanth starred by his father.

2004–present
He started his career as a hero in 2004 with a movie called Donga Dongadi. In 2005, he appeared in the movie Sri and next in Raju Bhai in 2007. His movie Nenu Meeku Telusa...? was an average grosser, but was known for its melodious music. In 2009, his first movie Prayanam, under the direction of Chandra Sekhar Yeleti did moderately well. His first movie in 2010, Bindaas, turned out to be the biggest hit of his career. Another movie in 2010, Vedam, was a critical and commercial success. He gained accolades for his role in Vedam. In 2012, he starred in Mr. Nookayya and Uu Kodathara? Ulikki Padathara?. In March 2013, he announced 5 films. His subsequent releases were Potugadu, Pandavulu Pandavulu Tummeda and Current Theega.After taking a long break from films, on 20th January 2023, Manchu Manoj announced his first film in 6 years titled "What the fish" directed by Vishnu and produced by Six Studios.

Personal life
In May 2015, Manoj married his girlfriend Pranathi Reddy. He confirmed divorce from his wife in October 2019. On 3 March 2023, he remarried Bhuma Mounika Reddy, the youngest daughter of Bhuma Nagi Reddy and Shobha Nagi Reddy, both former Members of the Legislative Assembly. Mounika has a 5–6 years old son from her previous marriage.

Filmography

Initiatives

Manoj Kumar's Unity
In 2017, Manoj started a foundation called Manoj Kumar's Unity to collect funds for the development of farmers.

It works by way of one donor nominating others on social media to do so.

References

External links

Indian male film actors
Living people
1983 births
Nandi Award winners
People from Rayalaseema
People from Chittoor district